HEPnet or the High-Energy Physics Network is a telecommunications network for researchers in high-energy physics.  It originated in the United States, but that has spread to most places involved in such research. Well-known sites include Argonne National Laboratory, Brookhaven National Laboratory and Lawrence Berkeley.

See also
 Energy Sciences Network

External links
HEPnet site

Computational particle physics